The Phantom of the West is a 1931 American pre-Code Western film serial and was the second all-talking serial produced by Mascot Pictures. Tom Tyler stars as Jim Lester, trying to prove that Francisco Cortez (Frank Lanning) is innocent of killing Lester's father years before. The real villain is the mysterious Phantom and his League of the Lawless.

Plot summary
Francisco Cortez escapes prison after serving fifteen years for the murder of Jim Lester's father.  Hunted by a posse, the escaped convict takes refuge in Jim Lester's house. When Lester discovers him, Cortez proclaims his innocence. He lists the names of seven men, one of which is the real killer, the murderer calling himself "The Phantom".

Cast
Tom Tyler as Jim Lester
William Desmond as Martin Blaine
Tom Santschi as Bud Landers
Dorothy Gulliver as Mona Cortez, Francisco Cortez's daughter
Philo McCullough as Royce Macklin
Frank Lanning as Francisco Cortez, escaped convict falsely accused of murdering Jim Lester's father
Tom Dugan as Oscar, Sheriff's deputy and comic relief
Joe Bonomo as Keno, a gunman
Frank Hagney as Sheriff Jim H. Ryan
Hallie Sullivan as Ruby Blair
Kermit Maynard as Peter Drake
Dick Dickinson as Harvey Stewart

Production

Stunts
Joe Bonomo
Yakima Canutt
Cliff Lyons
Kermit Maynard

Chapter titles
 The Ghost Rides
 Stairway of Doom
 Horror in the Dark
 Battle of the Strong
 League of the Lawless
 Canyon of Calamity
 Price of Silence
 House of Hate
 Fatal Secret
 Rogue's Roundup
Source:

See also
 List of film serials
 List of film serials by studio

References

External links

1931 films
American black-and-white films
1930s English-language films
Mascot Pictures film serials
1931 Western (genre) films
American Western (genre) films
Films directed by D. Ross Lederman
Films produced by Nat Levine
1930s American films